Pseudopelletierine is the main alkaloid derived from the root-bark of the pomegranate tree (Punica granatum), along with at least three other alkaloids: pelletierine, isopelletierine, and methylpelletierine (C9H17ON), which yield 1.8, 0.52, 0.01, and 0.20 grams per kilogram of raw bark. 

It is a homolog of tropinone, and can be synthesized in a manner analogous to the classical Robinson tropinone synthesis, using glutaraldehyde (rather than succinaldehyde), acetonedicarboxylic acid, and methylammonium chloride.  It was the starting material for Willstätter's 10-step synthesis of cyclooctatetraene, which was achieved after oxidation and several Hoffman elimination steps.

References 

Alkaloids
Ketones
Nitrogen heterocycles
Heterocyclic compounds with 2 rings